is a Buddhist temple in Matsuyama, Ehime Prefecture, Japan. The Hondō has been designated a National Treasure and a number of the temple's treasures are Important Cultural Properties.

Buildings
 Hondō (early Kamakura period), National Treasure

Treasures
  (Heian period) (Important Cultural Property)
  (Heian period) (ICP)
  (Heian period) (ICP)

See also

 List of National Treasures of Japan (temples)

References

Buddhist temples in Ehime Prefecture
National Treasures of Japan